Penperlleni is a hamlet within community and electoral ward of Goetre Fawr in Monmouthshire, Wales.

Etymology 

The name of Penperlleni derives from two Welsh words, Pen refers to the summit or top of a hill, the second element perlleni, has been interpreted as meaning a "round mass" and an "area of round hills", although the current Welsh word for orchard (perllan) may apply.

History and amenities 

Penperlleni was previously known as Pelleny (1256), Pethllenny (1330), Pelleny (1349) and Pellenig (1593). Penperlleni has a number of amenities, including a primary school, Goytre Fawr Primary School and a church, Capel Ed, a public house, the Goytre Arms and a village hall and post office.

Penperlleni lies on the Newport–Shrewsbury Trunk Road (A4042 road).

References

External links
 

Villages in Monmouthshire